La Poterie-Mathieu is a commune in the Eure department in Normandy in northern France. The lords of the manor were the de Livet family, and later their descendants the de Livet de Barville family, Marquis of Barville.

Population

See also
Communes of the Eure department

References

External links

 Official site

Communes of Eure